
The angle of the mandible (gonial angle) is located at the posterior border at the junction of the lower border of the ramus of the mandible.

The angle of the mandible, which may be either inverted or everted, is marked by rough, oblique ridges on each side, for the attachment of the masseter laterally, and the pterygoideus internus (medial pterygoid muscle) medially; the stylomandibular ligament is attached to the angle between these muscles.

The forensic term for the midpoint of the mandibular angle is the gonion. The gonion is a cephalometric landmark located at the lowest, posterior, and lateral point on the angle. This site is at the apex of the maximum curvature of the mandible, where the ascending ramus becomes the body of the mandible.

The mandibular angle has been named as a forensic tool for gender determination, but some studies have called into question whether there is any significant sex difference in humans in the angle.

Many mammals have a distinctive bony prong, the angular process, immediately above the angle of the mandible.

See also
Ohngren's line

Additional images

References

External links

 
  - "Oral Cavity: Bones"
 
 

Bones of the head and neck